is a Japanese former professional baseball player. He returned to the Carp in 2010.

Takahashi was born in Yokohama, Kanagawa, Japan. On February 6, 2009, Takahashi declared himself a free agent and expressed his desire to play in Major League Baseball. He later signed a minor league contract with an invitation to spring training with the Toronto Blue Jays.

Takahashi signed a minor league contract with the New York Mets on March 30, 2009, and was called up to the Major Leagues on April 26.  He made his MLB debut on May 2, coming into the game in the middle of the third inning to replace Óliver Pérez. Takahashi became only the third player in the post-World War II era to make his MLB debut at age 40 or older, joining Satchel Paige (42 for the Cleveland Indians in ) and Diomedes Olivo (41 for the Pittsburgh Pirates in ).

Takahashi was released by the Mets on October 20, 2009.

References

External links

1969 births
Buffalo Bisons (minor league) players
Hiroshima Toyo Carp players
Japanese baseball coaches
Japanese baseball players
Japanese expatriate baseball players in the United States
Living people
Major League Baseball players from Japan
New York Mets players
Nippon Professional Baseball coaches
Nippon Professional Baseball pitchers
Baseball people from Yokohama